Curtis Lynea Meinert (born 1934) is an American clinical trialist. He is a professor of epidemiology and biostatistics at Johns Hopkins Bloomberg School of Public Health.

Early life and education 
Meinert born in 1934 and was raised in rural Minnesota. He earned a doctor of philosophy in statistics at University of Minnesota in 1964. His dissertation was titled Quantitation of the isotope displacement of immunoassay of insulin. His advisor was Richard B. McHugh.

Career 
Meinert was the head of a clinical trial coordinating center at University of Maryland. Meinert researched randomized clinical trials for AIDS, cardiovascular diseases, and asthma.

He is a professor of epidemiology and biostatistics and the inaugural director of the Center for Clinical Trials at Johns Hopkins Bloomberg School of Public Health.

Awards and honors 
In 1979, Meinert was elected a fellow of the American College of Epidemiology. In 1995, he was elected Fellow of the American Association for the Advancement of Science. He was a 2001 Fellow of the American Heart Association. In 2006, he was elected a fellow of the Society for Clinical Trials. In 2005, Johns Hopkins University established the professorship, Curtis L. Meinert Professor of Clinical Trials.

References

Living people
1934 births
Mathematicians from Minnesota
University of Minnesota College of Liberal Arts alumni
University of Maryland, Baltimore faculty
Johns Hopkins Bloomberg School of Public Health faculty
Fellows of the American Association for the Advancement of Science
Biostatisticians
American epidemiologists
20th-century American mathematicians
American statisticians
21st-century American mathematicians
Fellows of the American College of Epidemiology